Battle for Thrace or Thracian derby is  the name of the local derby football match between PFC Botev Plovdiv and PFC Beroe Stara Zagora.

Parva Liga match statistics

Head-to-head ranking in First League (1948–2022)

• Total:  Beroe Stara Zagora with 19 higher finishes, Botev Plovdiv with 32 higher finishes (as of the end of the 2021–22 season).

Trophies

Botev Plovdiv and Beroe Stara Zagora are the only Bulgarian clubs, which managed to win at least once all major Bulgarian club tournaments (Bulgarian Championship,  Bulgarian Cup,  Bulgarian Supercup) and  Balkans Cup

Statistics

Biggest wins

Botev wins
8:1 - 22 December 1986
6:0 - 17 November 1968
4:1 - 1 December 2018
4:1 - 12 December 1984

Beroe wins
5:2 - 7 August 1999
3:0 - 21 September 1986 
3:0 - 26 April 2010

References

External links
 Botev vs Beroe Statistics, http://a-pfg.com Botev vs Beroe
 Balkans Cup Archive, Romeo Ionescu, RSSSF (Recreation & Sports Soccer Statistics Foundation)''
Bulgaria Cups Overview - Bulgarian Cups, RSSSF.com

Football derbies in Bulgaria
Botev Plovdiv
PFC Beroe Stara Zagora
Nicknamed sporting events